Nabawa is a small town in the Mid West region of Western Australia, and is located in the Shire of Chapman Valley  northeast of the city of Geraldton.

History
Nabawa derives its name from Nabawar Pool, a pool in the Chapman River first recorded by a surveyor in 1857. This Aboriginal word is said to mean "camp far away". The current spelling of Nabawa has been in use since 1872.

A Roman Catholic Assisted School was established in 1889. When the Upper Chapman railway was opened in 1910, a siding was opened near the pool and named Nabawa. The railway closed in 1961, but in 1964, the Shire of Chapman Valley moved its administrative headquarters to Nabawa from Nanson, and a townsite was declared in 1965.

Present day
The town contains Shire offices, a library, a community centre and playground, sport centre and oval, tavern, centenary park, St John Ambulance subcentre, Fire & Emergency Services subcentre and the Chapman Valley Primary School, which was established in 1892 and has, in 2013, 44 pupils between kindergarten and Year 7 who come from the surrounding agricultural district.

Climate
Nabawa is on the borderline of the semi-arid and Mediterranean climate zones, having hot dry summers and wet winters.

References

External links
 Navigating Nabawa (ABC) Contains pictures of the town.

Towns in Western Australia
Mid West (Western Australia)
1897 establishments in Australia